Duebenia is a genus of fungi in the family Dermateaceae. The genus contains 2 species.

See also 

 List of Dermateaceae genera

References

External links 

 Duebenia at Index Fungorum

Dermateaceae genera